DJ Hidden is an electronic music producer and DJ from Goes, Netherlands. His solo work consists of (Experimental) Drum & Bass, IDM and Crossbreed. He is one-half of Industrial Hardcore/Crossbreed duo, The Outside Agency, alongside Eye-D.

History
Wessels has been an active drum & bass and hardcore DJ and producer since 1991. His music career began in 1996, with the release of The Outside Agency EP on hardcore label Mokum Records. His first drum & bass track was released on Kultbox Records in 1998. Wessels has since released drum & bass music on record labels such as PRSPCT Recordings, Killing Sheep Records, Evol Intent Recordings, Outbreak Records, Ad Noiseam, Ruff-Teck Records, and many others.

He has released three full-length conceptual albums under this moniker entitled The Later After, The Words Below and Enclosed on Ad Noiseam, as well as a joint album release with Eye-D entitled Peer To Peer Pressure on PRSPCT Recordings. He also releases modern classical/IDM music under the moniker Semiomime.

Collaborations
In addition to his solo releases, Wessels has collaborated with Cooh, Counterstrike, Evol Intent, Forbidden Society. He frequently collaborates with Eye-D, with whom he also forms the hardcore outfit The Outside Agency. Since the release of The Outside Agency's first EP on Black Monolith Records in 2001, Wessels has used the "DJ Hidden" moniker solely for his drum & bass releases.

Discography
The following is a list of all of Wessels' drum & bass releases.

Albums
 2007: The Later After on Ad Noiseam
 2009: The Words Below on Ad Noiseam
 2011: Peer to Peer Pressure (with Eye-D) on PRSPCT Recordings
 2013: Enclosed on Ad Noiseam
 2015: P [ L ] A Y L I S T (Compilation album) on Hidden Tracks
 2015: Directive on Ad Noiseam/Hidden Tracks
 2019: The Nightmare Connector on PRSPCT Recordings

Singles and EPs
 1998: We Eat Tulips for Breakfast EP on Kultbox Records
 2000: Darkstreet Jazz / Sabre on Abstrakt Recordings
 2000: Untitled on Virtual Pulse Records
 2000: Ender / Uridium on Ruff-teck
 2001: Tsji-LP / People Are Programmed on Semiconscious Media
 2001: Incantation on Piruh
 2002: Thanatos on Fear Records
 2002: Fear 003 on Fear Records
 2002: The Wrong Way / Anamnesia on Ruff-Teck
 2002: Solid Tactics / Left-Ledge on Theoretic Records
 2002: Hidden / Scared on Fear Records
 2003: Afterglow on Ruff-Teck
 2004: It Begins on Killing Sheep Records
 2004: Ghost Story / The Surface on Metrik
 2004: Personality Disorder E.P. on Theoretic Records
 2004: Black Blood / Sonogrammar on Ruff-Teck Records
 2004: Where's The Score? (with Slacknote) on Evol Intent
 2005: The Resonators on Prspct
 2005: Death at a Distance EP on Outbreak Records
 2005: Wastelands on Ruff-Teck
 2006: Literal Evil on Killing Sheep Records
 2006: Prisoner of One Self / Masque De Mort on Dust of Sounds
 2006: Times Like These on Killing Sheep Records
 2006: The Gehenna Device / Corrupt on Sub/Version
 2006: Dead Silence on Fear Records
 2007: Consumed (with Forbidden Society) on Hardline Rekordingz
 2007: Joshua's War (with Eye-D) on PRSPCT Recordings
 2007: After Before on Ad Noiseam
 2008: Past The Flesh / Prayer's End on Killing Sheep Records
 2008: Faust Pact on Independenza Records
 2008: We Are Haunted / The Signs on Prspct
 2008: Sandwaves / Session 113 (Saw Darkness in You) on Flatline Ltd.
 2009: The Words Below Limited Edition Vinyl Series Part 1 on Ad Noiseam
 2009: The Words Below Limited Edition Vinyl Series Part 2 on Ad Noiseam
 2009: The Memento Mori EP on Sustained Records
 2009: Grim Noire on Bug Klinik Records
 2009: Untitled on Nekrolog1k Recordings
 2009: The Unseen on Mentally Disturbed
 2010: Imagination (with Switch Technique) on Union Recordings
 2010: The Words Below Limited Edition Vinyl Series Part 3 on Ad Noiseam
 2010: Empty Streets Revisited / Times Like These VIP on Killing Sheep Records
 2011: Scintillate on Sustained Records
 2011: The Outsider Looking In on Tantrum Recordings
 2011: You're Not Real / Breathe in Breathe Out  on Hidden Tracks
 2012: Existence (with Broken Note) on Ad Noiseam
 2012: Don't Fear The Darkness on Union Recordings
 2013: Lights Off: Only You Can See with vocals from Anneke Van Giersbergen of The Gathering on Hidden Tracks
 2013: Einstein / Tesla on Future Sickness Records
 2015: Directive Album Sampler #1 on Hidden Tracks
 2015: Directive Album Sampler #2 on Hidden Tracks
 2015: Evah Green EP on PRSPCT Recordings
 2017: The Place That Did Not Exist on Kosenprod
 2017: This World on Othercide Records

Remixes
 2004: Censor – Grey Line Reality (DJ Hidden Remix) on Hive Records
 2005: Censor – Grey Line Reality (DJ Hidden VIP Remix) on Handsome Devil Recordings
 2005: Eye-D & Kid Entropy – 640K (DJ Hidden Remix) on Soothsayer Recordings
 2006: Enduser – The Catalyst (DJ Hidden Remix) on Ad Noiseam
 2006: Aggroman – The Dark Side of the Moon (Eye-D & DJ Hidden Remix) on Aural Carnage
 2007: Detritus – Interrupted (DJ Hidden Remix) on Ad Noiseam
 2007: City of God – C'est Mon Monde (DJ Hidden Remix) on Independenza Records
 2007: Forbidden Society – Demons (DJ Hidden Remix) on Independenza Records
 2007: CDatakill – No Brakes (Remix By DJ Hidden) on Ad Noiseam
 2007: DJ G-I-S & Norman Wax – Leatherface (DJ Hidden Remix) on Intransigent Recordings
 2007: Xanopticon – Symptom (DJ Hidden Remix) on Thac0 Records
 2008: Fractional – En Attendant (DJ Hidden Remix) on Brume Records
 2008: Autoclav1.1 – Small Days (Broken By DJ Hidden) on Hive Records
 2009: Enduser – Manoeuvre (DJ Hidden RMX) on Soothsayer Recordings
 2009: Some Bedroom DJ – Symptom (DJ Hidden Remix) on Midweam Records
 2010: DJ Hidden – The Devil's Instant (DJ Hidden's Other Side Remix) on Ad Noiseam
 2011: Rregula & Dementia – Into My Mind (DJ Hidden Remix) on Trust in Music
 2011: Cativo – Evil Has No Boundaries (DJ Hidden Remix) on Nekrolog1k Recordings
 2012: DJ G-I-S & Norman Wax – Leatherface (DJ Hidden Remix) on Intransigent Recordings
 2013: MachineCode – Forsaken (DJ Hidden RMX) on Subsistenz
 2015: Hostage – Corporal Punishment (Hidden Remix) on Therapy Sessions Recordings
 2016: Brainpain - Humans (DJ Hidden Remix) on OtherCide Records
 2018: Circle of Dust - Machines Of Our Disgrace (DJ Hidden Remix) on FiXT
 2018: Triamer & Nagato - Hands Up (DJ Hidden Remix) on TriaMer Recordings
 2019: Meander - Stranger (DJ Hidden Remix) on PRSPCT Recordings

DJ performances
In addition to a busy production schedule, DJ Hidden still finds the time to regularly perform at events across the world, both as DJ Hidden and as part of The Outside Agency. In the Netherlands, DJ Hidden and Eye-D are frequent guests at prominent underground club nights "PRSPCT" and "Smackdown". Wessels has performed in Australia, Austria, Belarus, Belgium, Czech Republic, England, Estonia, France, Germany, Hungary, Italy, Japan, Lithuania, Latvia, Luxembourg, Poland, Portugal, Romania, Russia, Scotland, Slovakia, Spain, Sweden, Switzerland, Ukraine, Bulgaria and the United States.

References

External links
 
 

1975 births
Living people
Club DJs
Dutch drum and bass musicians
Dutch DJs
Dutch record producers
Hardcore techno musicians
People from Goes
Electronic dance music DJs